Jaspal Singh may refer to:

 Jaspal Parmar (born 1984), Indian footballer
 Jaspal Singh (cricketer) (1968-2015), Indian cricketer
 Jaspal Singh (singer), Indian singer
Jaspal Singh, a victim of 2010 Sikh beheadings by the Taliban